486 (four hundred and eighty-six) is the natural number following 485 and preceding 487; see 400 (number)#480s

486 may refer to a year:
 486 BC
 486 AD
 1486

486 may also refer to:
 i486, a computer processor
 4-8-6, a proposed locomotive type
 RU-486, the trial designation of the abortifacient drug Mifepristone